Shrvenants is a village in the Kapan Municipality of the Syunik Province in Armenia.

Etymology 
The village was previously known as Daymadaglu.

Demographics 
The Statistical Committee of Armenia reported its population was 76 in 2010, down from 72 at the 2001 census.

Gallery

References 

Populated places in Syunik Province